Sepia latimanus, also known as the broadclub cuttlefish, is widely distributed from the Andaman Sea, east to Fiji, and south to northern Australia. It is the most common cuttlefish species on coral reefs, living at a depth of up to 30 m.

Description 
Like many cephalopods, the broadclub can be seen displaying a range of colors and textures. Commonly they are light brown or yellowish with white mottled markings. Males are sometimes dark brown, particularly during courtship and mating. The arms have longitudinal white bands that appear as broad white blotches when extended. Some arms have longitudinal brown bands that extend to the head. The dorsal mantle can sometimes be seen with a saddle mark with small white and brown spots. The dorsal mantle also has narrow brown transverse bands, and bold, white, transverse stripes and spots. The eyes are yellow around the ventral margins and the fins are pale with white, transverse stripes extending onto mantle and narrow, white bands along outer margins.

Distribution
Sepia latimanus has a wide distribution in the Indo-Pacific region from the coasts of eastern Africa in the west following the continental coastline through southern Asia to southern Japan and as far south as northern Australia and the Coral Sea. Records from southern Australia and Madagascar are thought to be most likely misidentifications.

Habitat and biology
Sepia latimanus is a coastal species occurring in coral reefs and which is found in shallow water to depths of 30 m. In the western Pacific, off Guam and off Okinawa in the shallows from January to May, and the resultant eggs hatch in 38 to 40 days. It is diurnal species which appears to mesmerise its prey by using a display consisting of a series of rhythmic colour bands running along its body. It preys on fishes and crustaceans and it is known to prey on shrimp and prawns of the genus Palaemon. Breeding males are territorial and defend a coral head, typically Porites, the  females lay eggs following mating in the territory of the male. Their courtship is highly ritualized and stereotyped, and like their hunting behaviour it includes striking visual displays. The males frequently guard the females, defending them from other males. The male and female mate head-to-head, the male placing the spermatophores in the buccal membrane of the female below to the mouth. After laying the eggs harden and are very hard to remove from the coral on which the female laid them. After hatching the young cuttlefish start to  hide among the coral and the associated coral rubble where they often mimic mangrove leaves, their coloration and posture impersonating the leaf structure with a stem, ribs and a scattering of black spots.

Naming and taxonomy
The type specimen of Sepia latimus was collected in New Guinea and is deposited at the Muséum National d'Histoire Naturelle in Paris. This species has a wide geographic range and it is probable that it represents a species complex rather than a single species but more taxonomic work needs to be carried out to assess its species limits.

See also
Cephalopod size

References

External links

 Marinebio.org - Broadclub cuttlefish
 

Cuttlefish
Cephalopods described in 1832